Prumnopitys ferruginoides is a species of conifer in the family Podocarpaceae. It is found only in New Caledonia.

References

ferruginoides
Endemic flora of New Caledonia
Least concern plants
Taxonomy articles created by Polbot